Udo Fortune (born 2 February 1988) is a Nigerian professional footballer who plays for Vietnamese club Đồng Tháp, as a striker.

Career
Born in Warri, Fortune has played for Becamex Bình Dương, Hapoel Nir Ramat HaSharon, Bali United, Persik Kediri, Mosta and Đồng Tháp.

References

1988 births
Living people
Nigerian footballers
Becamex Binh Duong FC players
Hapoel Nir Ramat HaSharon F.C. players
Negeri Sembilan FA players
Persisam Putra Samarinda players
Persik Kediri players
Mosta F.C. players
Dong Thap FC players
V.League 1 players
Israeli Premier League players
Liga 1 (Indonesia) players
Maltese Premier League players
Association football forwards
Nigerian expatriate footballers
Nigerian expatriate sportspeople in Vietnam
Expatriate footballers in Vietnam
Nigerian expatriate sportspeople in Israel
Expatriate footballers in Israel
Nigerian expatriate sportspeople in Indonesia
Expatriate footballers in Indonesia
Nigerian expatriate sportspeople in Malta
Expatriate footballers in Malta
Sportspeople from Warri